Apostolos Christopoulos (born 29 January 2003) is a Greek professional footballer who plays as a forward for Super League 2 club AEK Athens B.

References

2003 births
Living people
Greek footballers
Greece youth international footballers
Super League Greece 2 players
AEK Athens F.C. players
Association football forwards
AEK Athens F.C. B players